Buddika Madushan (born 17 November 1990) is a Sri Lankan cricketer. He made his Twenty20 debut for Sri Lanka Navy Sports Club in the 2017–18 SLC Twenty20 Tournament on 1 March 2018. He made his List A debut for Sri Lanka Navy Sports Club in the 2017–18 Premier Limited Overs Tournament on 11 March 2018.

References

External links
 

1990 births
Living people
Sri Lankan cricketers
Sri Lanka Navy Sports Club cricketers
People from Ragama